This is a list of Segunda División winning football managers.

Seasons and winning managers

Multiple winners

By nationality

References

  
Segunda División